The Catholic Church of St Edmund of Canterbury is a Roman Catholic church in Nelson Road, Whitton, Richmond-upon-Thames, London. It is part of the Upper Thames Deanery of the Diocese of Westminster. It is dedicated to Edmund Rich (also known as Saint Edmund or Eadmund of Canterbury, and as Saint Edmund of Abingdon) (1175–1240), who was a 13th-century Archbishop of Canterbury.

The congregation was established by the Edmundite Fathers, who acquired land in 1934 and converted existing structures on the property into a chapel for worship. A permanent church was built in 1937 but destroyed by German bombing on 29 October 1940, during the Blitz. The current church was completed in 1963 and consecrated in 1972.

In 1988, the Edmundites withdrew to the United States, and the parish has since been staffed by diocesan clergy.

Building
The current church building, constructed between 1961 and 1963, to replace the original building dating from 1935, was designed by F. X. Velarde and completed for the F. X. Velarde Partnership by Richard O'Mahony.

The aumbry for oils is by David John, but the font by the same designer is no longer there.

Services

Mass is held every morning and also on Saturday and Sunday evenings.

Communications
The church publishes a weekly newsletter, St Edmund's Chronicle.

References

External links 
 

1934 establishments in England
20th-century Roman Catholic church buildings in the United Kingdom
Christian organizations established in 1934
Churches bombed by the Luftwaffe in London
Churches in the Roman Catholic Diocese of Westminster
Saint Edmund
Roman Catholic churches completed in 1963
Roman Catholic churches in the London Borough of Richmond upon Thames